"Throw It Back" is a country music song by Breland featuring Keith Urban. The song was written by  Breland, Keith Urban, Sam Sumser, and Sean Small, and was produced by Sumser and Small. The song was released through Bad Realm and Atlantic Records on June 4, 2021, as the second single from Breland's debut album Cross Country.

Background
Breland met Keith Urban in the summer of 2020 and they began working on the song. "Throw It Back" was the first song that Breland and Urban worked on together, but they released "Out the Cage" first from Urban's eleventh album The Speed of Now Part 1.

Release and reception
The song was released on June 4, 2021 alongside a music video. On August 14, 2021, the song debuted on the Billboard Hot Country Songs chart, where it remained for fifteen weeks, peaking at number thirty-eight. The song was one of the most popular songs on Amazon Music's Country Heat playlist in 2021.

Breland and Urban were highlighted artists in the 2022 edition of the Country Music Hall of Fame's "American Currents" exhibit.

Charts

"Throw It Back" did not enter the Billboard Canadian Hot 100, but peaked at number 42 on the Hot Canadian Digital Song Sales chart.

Certifications

References

2021 singles
2021 songs
Breland (musician) songs
Keith Urban songs
Songs written by Keith Urban
Male vocal duets
Atlantic Records singles
Songs written by Sean Small
Songs written by Sam Sumser
Songs written by Breland (musician)